Association Sportive Eliwidj FC is a Malian football club based in Aguelhok. They play in the Malien Premiere Division the top division in Malian football.

League participations
Malien Premiere Division: 2013–
Malien Second Division: ?-2013

Stadium
Currently the team plays at the Aguelhok Stadium.

External links
Soccerway

E